(born June 21, 1952) is a Japanese former anime director and the founder of the animation studio Bee Train. Since the creation of the studio, Mashimo directed or otherwise participated in a large number of the studio's works, for example, as a member of the art or sound department.

Biography 

Kōichi Mashimo was born in Tokyo, Japan and from his early years showed interest in photography, under the influence of his father. Mashimo studied jurisprudence at Sophia University and during his fourth university year, he participated in the making of several television commercials. However, this was a rather disappointing experience, and on November 6, 1975, he applied for a position of Hiroshi Sasagawa's assistant director in Tatsunoko Production. The first anime series he worked on was Time Bokan (1975–76).

In the mid-1980s, while still working for Tatsunoko, Mashimo survived a severe alpine skiing accident. During his stay in an intensive care unit, he came up with an idea of a "hospital for animators", an animation studio whose primary goal would be fostering and self-actualization of talented artists rather than commercial success and money. Some time after that, he founded a small freelance studio called Mashimo Jimusho that was mainly producing in-between animation for larger companies. In 1997, Mashimo presented his studio-as-hospital concept to Mitsuhisa Ishikawa, the president of Production I.G, who was so impressed with it that he immediately agreed to sponsor Mashimo. The new subsidiary has become known as Bee Train and in February 2006, it ended its relationship with I.G and became independent.

Approach and style
Mashimo generally storyboards all the anime he directs. As one of the leading and only regular on-staff directors at Bee Train, most series are fully directed by him. As Bee Train has expanded, more directors have been able to handle episode direction under Mashimo's supervision, such as Tsubasa Chronicle.

Mashimo is known for frequently hiring Yuki Kajiura to compose for his projects. Their first project being Eat-Man, then going onto Noir, as well as .hack//Sign, Liminality, and Tsubasa Chronicle. Besides Kajiura, many Mashimo and Bee Train's projects bring back voice actors and crew members. Some noted cast members include: Maaya Sakamoto (.hack//SIGN, Blade of the Immortal, Tsubasa Chronicle), Sanae Kobayashi (Madlax, .hack//Roots, .hack//Liminality), as well as noted crew members such as character designer Minako Shiba, Satoshi Oshawa, and artist and director Kōji Sawai, as well as writers such as Hiroyuki Kawasaki.

Mashimo believes in giving music prominence in his works, rather than using it as background noise.

Some of Mashimo's major projects have featured strong female protagonists. The famous "girls with guns" trilogy (Noir, Madlax, El Cazador de la Bruja) have all featured female characters in lead roles. One of his earlier films, The Weathering Continent, also featured a young woman who takes matters into her own hands to save her people. Others such as Madlax have also been known to contain subtle hints at lesbian relations.

Mashimo once remarked that he would like to have met the photographers Richard Avedon, Jeanloup Sieff, and Helmut Newton and film directors John Ford and Alfred Hitchcock. Mashimo is particularly fond of the French movie Les Aventuriers (1967) and has even named a character in Madlax after the protagonist of that film.

Filmography

References

General references

External links
 
 Kōichi Mashimo at the Bee Train Fan Wiki
 
Koichi Mashimo at Anime-Wiki

1952 births
Living people
 
Anime directors
Japanese Roman Catholics
Christian existentialists
People from Tokyo
Tatsunoko Production people
Japanese storyboard artists